The California Roots Music and Art Festival (Cali Roots) is an American annual music and art festival, featuring reggae, reggae rock, folk, hip hop acts and live painting on-stage. The festival was founded in 2010 and is held at the Monterey County Fairgrounds in Monterey, California which was previously home of the Monterey Pop Festival where Jimi Hendrix set his guitar on fire in 1967. In its first year, the festival began as a one-day event headlining the Dirty Heads and Tribal Seeds. Today, The California Roots Festival has grown enormously in both size and attendance. It is organized over three full days with more than 11,000 attendees each day. It is described as the largest reggae-rock festival in the world and claims to one of the largest reggae festivals in the United States.

History
Jeff Monser founded the California Roots Music and Arts Festival. The first versions were small one-day live music events with local attendance and mostly limited to bands drawn from a limited geographic area. Three years later, Dan Sheehan joined as a co-founder of the festival. Sheehan was able to lay the groundwork for managing logistics and securing major reggae acts in order to play at the festival. These changes enabled this one-day music event to evolve into its current four-day format. Sheehan was able to construct one of the largest reggae and reggae-rock music festival in the world.

Festival Organization
The current festival involves curated lineups of live music, interactive art on stage, and engagement of a variety of events related to the practice and celebration of reggae culture over three days. The festival also works closely with pairs with non-profit organizations to raise funds for causes that align with the brand of Cali Roots. In recent years, the event has attracted more than 13,000 people each day. The California Roots Music and Arts Festival continues to grow rapidly. The festival takes steps to allows for freedom of expression and for fans to engage politically through music. Cali Roots Festival has headlined many notable reggae-like bands and artists over the years, including Atmosphere, Rebelution, Nas, Dirty Heads, and Slightly Stoopid.

Performers

See also
List of reggae festivals

References

External links
 Official website

Events in the Monterey Bay Area
Festivals in the Monterey Bay Area
Music festivals in California
Tourist attractions in Monterey, California